William Chappell (27 September 19071 January 1994) was a British dancer, ballet designer and director. He is most noted for his designs for more than 40 ballets or revues, including many of the early works of Sir Frederick Ashton and Dame Ninette de Valois.

Early life
Chappell was born in Wolverhampton, the son of theatrical manager Archibald Chappell and his wife Edith Eva Clara Black (née Edith Blair-Staples). Edith, the daughter of an army officer, was raised in Ceylon and India; in pursuing a career in repertory acting, she moved away from her upper-middle-class roots and married twice to fellow actors, by the first of whom she had a daughter, Hermina, the second time being to Archibald Chappell, by whom she had two daughters, Dorothea and Honor, followed by Billy. Chappell was acutely aware of his 'déclassé origins': whereas his mother's brother had maintained a conventional upper-middle-class life, being a tea-planter in Ceylon and able to provide his son, Patrick (who was close to Billy and spent time with his aunt's family in school vacations) with a public school and Oxford education, Chappell studied at Balham Grammar School.

 After his father deserted the family when he was still a baby, Chappell and his mother moved to Balham, London, where she pursued a career as a fashion journalist. Edith's daughter by her first marriage, romantic novelist Hermina Black, Chappell's half-sister, was living nearby in Wandsworth. Chappell studied at the Chelsea School of Art where aged fourteen he met fellow students Edward Burra and Barbara Ker-Seymer forging a life-long friendship.

He did not take up dancing seriously until he was seventeen when he studied under Marie Rambert, whom he met through his friend Frederick Ashton.

Career

Dance
For two years Chappell and Ashton toured Europe with Ida Rubenstein's company under the direction of Massine and Nijinska. Chappell returned to London in 1929 to dance with Rambert's Ballet Club (later Ballet Rambert), the Camargo Society and Ninette de Valois's Vic-Wells Ballet becoming one of the founding dancers of British ballet. Throughout the 1930s he created more than forty roles for Rambert and Vic-Wells including:
 The Rake's friend in de Valois's The Rake's Progress
 The popular song in Ashton's Facade
 The title role in Ashton's The Lord of Burleigh
 The recreation of two Nijinsky roles, Le Spectre de la rose and the faun in L'Apres-midi d'un faune

Design
His flair as a designer was encouraged by Rambert and for this he is best remembered. In parallel with his dance career he designed more than 40 ballets or revues, including many of the early works of Ashton and de Valois including:
 Antony Tudor's Lysistrata
 Oxbridge partnership Norman Marshall & Geoffrey Wright's revue Members Only (With Charles Hawtrey and Hermione Gingold at the Gate Theatre Studio, 16A Villiers Street - 1937)
 Ninette de Valois' The Wise and Foolish Virgins, Bar aux Folies-Bergère and Fête polonaise (music by Glinka - 1941)
 Ashton's Les Rendezvous (music by Auber - 1936), Les Patineurs (music by Giacomo Meyerbeer, arranged by Constant Lambert - 1937) and The Judgement of Paris (music by Lennox Berkeley - 1938)
 Giselle and Coppélia for the Sadler's Wells Company
 Costume design for Ashton's Capriol Suite, (music, Peter Warlock’s arr. sixteenth century peasant dances) and La Péri (music by Paul Dukas - 1931)
also
 The Blue bird (The Enchanted Princess), (music by Pyotr Tchaikovsky for the Vic-Wells Ballet - 1936)
 Frank Staff's The Seasons (music by Glasunov for Tudor's London Ballet - 1940) and the dance suite Tartans (music by William Boyce - 1940)
 Mona Inglesby's Amoras (music by Elgar for the International Ballet - 1941) and costume design for Everyman (music by Richard Strauss, arranged from the original scores by Ernest Irving - 1942)
His designs for Les Patineurs remained in the repertory and his conception for Les Rendezvous, although frequently revised, continues. He brought his vast experience of ballet design to opera, musical theatre, revues and drama, as both director and designer.

Direction
Chappell has been credited as directing the following productions:
 The Lyric Revue (Lyric Theatre, Hammersmith and the Globe Theatre, London with Dora Bryan, Graham Payn and Ian Carmichael - 1951–1954)
 High Spirits (revue) (London Hippodrome with Cyril Ritchard and Diana Churchill - 1953)
 Sheridan's The Rivals (Saville Theatre, London with Laurence Harvey - 1956)
 Noël Coward's South Sea Bubble (Lyric Theatre with Vivien Leigh - 1956)
 Arthur Macrae and Richard Addinsell's revue, Living for Pleasure (Garrick Theatre with Dora Bryan, Daniel Massey, George Rose and Lynda Baron - 1958)
 Wolf Mankowitz's Expresso Bongo (Saville Theatre with Paul Scofield - 1958)
 Frank Loesser's Where's Charley? (Palace Theatre, London - 1958/59)  
 On The Avenue (revue) (Globe Theatre Beryl Reid and George Rose - 1961)
 Passion Flower Hotel (Ambassador) 1965 
 George Farquhar's The Beaux' Stratagem (Chichester Festival Theatre - 1967).  
 The West End revival of Enid Bagnold's The Chalk Garden (Theatre Royal Haymarket, London with Gladys Cooper and Joan Greenwood - 1971)

Libretto and production
The Violins of Saint-Jacques (1966)

Cinema
Chappell played the part of the court painter Titorelli in Orson Welles' The Trial (1962 film), based on the Kafka novel of the same name (along with many of the other actors in the film, his voice was dubbed by Welles himself).

Military service
At the outbreak of war in 1939, he was the first male dancer to join, spending the duration of the war as a second lieutenant and entertaining the troops.

In his book Studies in Ballet he describes an occasion in North Africa when his company had no transport and had to march to their destination about eighteen miles away. He used this story to illustrate the benefit of ballet training to legs and feet, allowing a middle-aged man to arrive fresher than men nearly half his age, who had only received the routine Army physical training. He also emphasised the importance of a long unbroken tradition and continuity in the training of male dancers. He was of the opinion that the war was a factor that had caused chaos in the Sadler's Wells Company and rendered valueless years of work. He contrasted the treatment of the ballet in England and in Russia, where male dancers were considered important enough in their work to be kept in it.

Personal life
He was invited by writer and lecturer on dance Peter Brinson to take part in a series of eight lectures on 'The Ballet in Britain' at Oxford University where he entertained an academic audience with his thoughts on problems of ballet design. Other speakers included Dame Ninette de Valois director of the Royal Ballet, Marie Rambert, Arnold Haskell, William Cole and Douglas Kennedy

He retired to his home in Rye and died there after a long illness.

Filmography
Nijinsky (1980) - restaging: of "L'Après-midi d'un faune" (as William Chapell)
The Trial (1962) - as the painter Titorelli
Expresso Bongo with Paul Scofield (BBC recording of Saville Theatre, London production, 1958) - Director
The Prince and the Showgirl (1957) - dance arranger
Moulin Rouge (1952) - dance director
Flesh and Blood (1951) - Dancer (uncredited)
Golden Arrow (1949) - costume designer
The Winslow Boy (1948) - costume designer
Le Lac des Cygnes with Margot Fonteyn, Robert Helpmann and the Vic-Wells Ballet Company on BBC Television (13 December 1937) - as Benno
Job with Robert Helpmann, and the Vic-Wells Ballet Company (now The Royal Ballet) produced and choreographed by Ninette de Valois on BBC Television (11 November 1936) - as Elihu/The Three Messengers.†
† This was the second broadcast of ballet on British television following the official start of the BBC high definition television service on 2 November 1936.

Bibliography
Studies in ballet, William Chappell, John Lehmann Ltd, London (1948) 
Fonteyn: Impressions of a ballerina, William Chappell, Rockcliff Publishing Corporation Ltd, London (1951) 
Edward Burra: A painter remembered by his friend, William Chappell, HarperCollins Distribution Services (1982) 
Well Dearie!: The Letters of Edward Burra, William Chappell, Gordon Fraser Gallery Ltd, London (1985)

See also
 List of people from Wolverhampton
 Edward Burra

References

External links

William Chappell as Elihu in 'Job', by Gordon Anthony. National Portrait Gallery.
 Filmed at the Mercury Theatre, London, by Walter and Pearl Duff. Choreography: Frederick Ashton, inspired by Degas' ballet paintings. Costumes: William Chappell, after Degas.
 Gale, Matthew (October 1997) Tate Gallery Artist Biography: William Chappell 1907-1994
Painting of William Chappell by Edward Burra

 William Chappell (dancer)
Alumni of Chelsea College of Arts
English male dancers
English male ballet dancers
English costume designers
Ballet designers
English theatre directors
British Army personnel of World War II
People from Wolverhampton
English non-fiction writers
1907 births
1994 deaths
English male non-fiction writers
20th-century English male writers